The IFFHS World's Best Goalkeeper is a football award given annually since 1987 to the best goalkeeper of the year as voted by the International Federation of Football History & Statistics (IFFHS). The votes are cast by IFFHS's editorial staff as well as experts from different continents.

The winner is announced at the end of the year. The winning goalkeeper is awarded a gold trophy at the World Football Gala. Italy's Gianluigi Buffon, Spain's Iker Casillas and Germany's Manuel Neuer have each won the award a record five times; Casillas won the award for five consecutive years between 2008 and 2012. Below is a list of the previous winners since the first award in 1987, which was won by Belgium's Jean-Marie Pfaff. Bayern Munich is the team with the most wins, with a total of nine.

Men's winners

Gianluigi Buffon has made the top three an unprecedented fourteen times. This includes five wins (joint record with Iker Casillas and Manuel Neuer), six runner-up (record) and three third-placed finishes.

List of winners 
{|class="wikitable"
|-
!Year
!Rank
!Player
!Club(s)
!Points
|-
| rowspan="3" align="center" |1987
|scope=col style="background-color: gold"|1st
| Jean-Marie Pfaff
| Bayern Munich| align="center" |137|-
|scope=col style="background-color: silver"|2nd
| Rinat Dasayev
| Spartak Moscow
| align="center" |43
|-
|scope=col style="background-color: #cc9966"|3rd
| Walter Zenga
| Inter Milan
| align="center" |30
|-
! colspan="5" |
|-
| rowspan="3" align="center" |1988|scope=col style="background-color: gold"|1st| Rinat Dasayev| Spartak Moscow| align="center" |119|-
|scope=col style="background-color: silver"|2nd
| Hans van Breukelen
| PSV Eindhoven
| align="center" |97
|-
|scope=col style="background-color: #cc9966"|3rd
| Walter Zenga
| Inter Milan
| align="center" |31
|-
! colspan="5" |
|-
| rowspan="3" align="center" |1989|scope=col style="background-color: gold"|1st| Walter Zenga| Inter Milan| align="center" |79|-
|scope=col style="background-color: silver"|2nd
| Michel Preud'homme
| KV Mechelen
| align="center" |38
|-
|scope=col style="background-color: #cc9966"|3rd
| Rinat Dasayev
| Sevilla
| align="center" |33
|-
! colspan="5" |
|-
| rowspan="3" align="center" |1990|scope=col style="background-color: gold"|1st| Walter Zenga| Inter Milan| align="center" |72|-
|scope=col style="background-color: silver"|2nd
| Michel Preud'homme
| KV Mechelen
| align="center" |35
|-
|scope=col style="background-color: #cc9966"|3rd
| Gabelo Conejo
| Cartaginés
| align="center" |34
|-
! colspan="5" |
|-
| rowspan="3" align="center" |1991|scope=col style="background-color: gold"|1st| Walter Zenga| Inter Milan| align="center" |51|-
|scope=col style="background-color: silver"|2nd
| Sergio Goycochea
| Racing Club
| align="center" |37
|-
|scope=col style="background-color: #cc9966"|3rd
| Cláudio Taffarel
| Parma
| align="center" |29
|-
! colspan="5" |
|-
| rowspan="3" align="center" |1992|scope=col style="background-color: gold"|1st| Peter Schmeichel| Manchester United| align="center" |118|-
|scope=col style="background-color: silver"|2nd
| Andoni Zubizarreta
| Barcelona
| align="center" |28
|-
|scope=col style="background-color: #cc9966"|3rd
| Hans van Breukelen
| PSV Eindhoven
| align="center" |23
|-
! colspan="5" |
|-
| rowspan="3" align="center" |1993|scope=col style="background-color: gold"|1st| Peter Schmeichel| Manchester United| align="center" |84|-
|scope=col style="background-color: silver"|2nd
| Sergio Goycochea
| Racing Club
| align="center" |70
|-
|scope=col style="background-color: #cc9966"|3rd
| Jorge Campos
| UNAM
| align="center" |23
|-
! colspan="5" |
|-
| rowspan="3" align="center" |1994|scope=col style="background-color: gold"|1st| Michel Preud'homme| KV Mechelen Benfica| align="center" |103|-
|scope=col style="background-color: silver"|2nd
| Thomas Ravelli
| IFK Göteborg
| align="center" |73
|-
|scope=col style="background-color: #cc9966"|3rd
| Cláudio Taffarel
| Reggiana
| align="center" |53
|-
! colspan="5" |
|-
| rowspan="3" align="center" |1995|scope=col style="background-color: gold"|1st| José Luis Chilavert| Vélez Sársfield| align="center" |37|-
|scope=col style="background-color: silver"|2nd
| Peter Schmeichel
| Manchester United
| align="center" |29
|-
|scope=col style="background-color: #cc9966"|3rd
| Thomas Ravelli
| IFK Göteborg
| align="center" |24
|-
! colspan="5" |
|-
| rowspan="3" align="center" |1996|scope=col style="background-color: gold"|1st| Andreas Köpke| Marseille| align="center" |114|-
|scope=col style="background-color: silver"|2nd
| David Seaman
| Arsenal
| align="center" |101
|-
|scope=col style="background-color: #cc9966"|3rd
| José Luis Chilavert
| Vélez Sársfield
| align="center" |44
|-
! colspan="5" |
|-
| rowspan="3" align="center" |1997|scope=col style="background-color: gold"|1st| José Luis Chilavert| Vélez Sársfield| align="center" |61|-
|scope=col style="background-color: silver"|2nd
| Angelo Peruzzi
| Juventus
| align="center" |57
|-
|scope=col style="background-color: #cc9966"|3rd
| Peter Schmeichel
| Manchester United
| align="center" |53
|-
! colspan="5" |
|-
| rowspan="3" align="center" |1998|scope=col style="background-color: gold"|1st| José Luis Chilavert| Vélez Sársfield| align="center" |198|-
|scope=col style="background-color: silver"|2nd
| Fabien Barthez
| Monaco
| align="center" |146
|-
|scope=col style="background-color: #cc9966"|3rd
| Edwin van der Sar
| Ajax
| align="center" |75
|-
! colspan="5" |
|-
| rowspan="3" align="center" |1999|scope=col style="background-color: gold"|1st| Oliver Kahn| Bayern Munich| align="center" |116|-
|scope=col style="background-color: silver"|2nd
| Peter Schmeichel
| Manchester United
| align="center" |95
|-
|scope=col style="background-color: #cc9966"|3rd
| José Luis Chilavert
| Vélez Sársfield
| align="center" |93
|-
! colspan="5" |
|-
| rowspan="3" align="center" |2000|scope=col style="background-color: gold"|1st| Fabien Barthez| Monaco Manchester United| align="center" |195|-
|scope=col style="background-color: silver"|2nd
| Oliver Kahn
| Bayern Munich
| align="center" |133
|-
|scope=col style="background-color: #cc9966"|3rd
| Francesco Toldo
| Fiorentina
| align="center" |131
|-
! colspan="5" |
|-
| rowspan="3" align="center" |2001|scope=col style="background-color: gold"|1st| Oliver Kahn| Bayern Munich| align="center" |265|-
|scope=col style="background-color: silver"|2nd
| Oscar Córdoba
| Boca Juniors
| align="center" |77
|-
|scope=col style="background-color: #cc9966"|3rd
| Gianluigi Buffon
| Parma Juventus
| align="center" |69
|-
! colspan="5" |
|-
| rowspan="3" align="center" |2002|scope=col style="background-color: gold"|1st| Oliver Kahn| Bayern Munich| align="center" |316|-
|scope=col style="background-color: silver"|2nd
| Iker Casillas
| Real Madrid
| align="center" |101
|-
|scope=col style="background-color: #cc9966"|3rd
| Rüştü Reçber
| Fenerbahçe
| align="center" |99
|-
! colspan="5" |
|-
| rowspan="3" align="center" |2003|scope=col style="background-color: gold"|1st| Gianluigi Buffon| Juventus| align="center" |186|-
|scope=col style="background-color: silver"|2nd
| Iker Casillas
| Real Madrid
| align="center" |112
|-
|scope=col style="background-color: #cc9966"|3rd
| Oliver Kahn
| Bayern Munich
| align="center" |106
|-
! colspan="5" |
|-
| rowspan="3" align="center" |2004|scope=col style="background-color: gold"|1st| Gianluigi Buffon| Juventus| align="center" |185|-
|scope=col style="background-color: silver"|2nd
| Petr Čech
| Rennes Chelsea
| align="center" |125
|-
|scope=col style="background-color: #cc9966"|3rd
| Dida
| Milan
| align="center" |78
|-
! colspan="5" |
|-
| rowspan="3" align="center" |2005|scope=col style="background-color: gold"|1st| Petr Čech| Chelsea| align="center" |175|-
|scope=col style="background-color: silver"|2nd
| Dida
| Milan
| align="center" |91
|-
|scope=col style="background-color: #cc9966"|3rd
| Gianluigi Buffon
| Juventus
| align="center" |78
|-
! colspan="5" |
|-
| rowspan="3" align="center" |2006|scope=col style="background-color: gold"|1st| Gianluigi Buffon| Juventus| align="center" |295|-
|scope=col style="background-color: silver"|2nd
| Jens Lehmann
| Arsenal
| align="center" |140
|-
|scope=col style="background-color: #cc9966"|3rd
| Petr Čech
| Chelsea
| align="center" |91
|-
! colspan="5" |
|-
| rowspan="3" align="center" |2007|scope=col style="background-color: gold"|1st| Gianluigi Buffon| Juventus| align="center" |209|-
|scope=col style="background-color: silver"|2nd
| Petr Čech
| Chelsea
| align="center" |172
|-
|scope=col style="background-color: #cc9966"|3rd
| Iker Casillas
| Real Madrid
| align="center" |124
|-
! colspan="5" |
|-
| rowspan="3" align="center" |2008|scope=col style="background-color: gold"|1st| Iker Casillas| Real Madrid| align="center" |249|-
|scope=col style="background-color: silver"|2nd
| Gianluigi Buffon
| Juventus
| align="center" |170
|-
|scope=col style="background-color: #cc9966"|3rd
| Edwin van der Sar
| Manchester United
| align="center" |143
|-
! colspan="5" |
|-
| rowspan="3" align="center" |2009|scope=col style="background-color: gold"|1st| Iker Casillas| Real Madrid| align="center" |230|-
|scope=col style="background-color: silver"|2nd
| Gianluigi Buffon
| Juventus
| align="center" |150
|-
|scope=col style="background-color: #cc9966"|3rd
| Júlio César
| Inter Milan
| align="center" |124
|-
! colspan="5" |
|-
| rowspan="3" align="center" |2010|scope=col style="background-color: gold"|1st| Iker Casillas| Real Madrid| align="center" |304|-
|scope=col style="background-color: silver"|2nd
| Júlio César
| Inter Milan
| align="center" |124
|-
|scope=col style="background-color: #cc9966"|3rd
| Petr Čech
| Chelsea
| align="center" |56
|-
! colspan="5" |
|-
| rowspan="3" align="center" |2011|scope=col style="background-color: gold"|1st| Iker Casillas| Real Madrid| align="center" |248|-
|scope=col style="background-color: silver"|2nd
| Manuel Neuer
| Schalke 04 Bayern Munich
| align="center" |130
|-
|scope=col style="background-color: #cc9966"|3rd
| Víctor Valdés
| Barcelona
| align="center" |114
|-
! colspan="5" |
|-
| rowspan="3" align="center" |2012|scope=col style="background-color: gold"|1st| Iker Casillas| Real Madrid| align="center" |224|-
|scope=col style="background-color: silver"|2nd
| Gianluigi Buffon
| Juventus
| align="center" |128
|-
|scope=col style="background-color: #cc9966"|3rd
| Petr Čech
| Chelsea
| align="center" |92
|-
! colspan="5" |
|-
| rowspan="3" align="center" |2013|scope=col style="background-color: gold"|1st| Manuel Neuer| Bayern Munich| align="center" |211|-
|scope=col style="background-color: silver"|2nd
| Gianluigi Buffon
| Juventus
| align="center" |78
|-
|scope=col style="background-color: #cc9966"|3rd
| Petr Čech
| Chelsea
| align="center" |64
|-
! colspan="5" |
|-
| rowspan="3" align="center" |2014|scope=col style="background-color: gold"|1st| Manuel Neuer| Bayern Munich| align="center" |216|-
|scope=col style="background-color: silver"|2nd
| Thibaut Courtois
| Atlético Madrid Chelsea
| align="center" |96
|-
|scope=col style="background-color: #cc9966"|3rd
| Keylor Navas
| Levante Real Madrid
| align="center" |46
|-
! colspan="5" |
|-
| rowspan="3" align="center" |2015|scope=col style="background-color: gold"|1st| Manuel Neuer| Bayern Munich| align="center" |188|-
|scope=col style="background-color: silver"|2nd
| Gianluigi Buffon
| Juventus
| align="center" |78
|-
|scope=col style="background-color: #cc9966"|3rd
| Claudio Bravo
| Barcelona
| align="center" |45
|-
! colspan="5" |
|-
| rowspan="3" align="center" |2016|scope=col style="background-color: gold"|1st| Manuel Neuer| Bayern Munich| align="center" |156|-
|scope=col style="background-color: silver"|2nd
| Gianluigi Buffon
| Juventus
| align="center" |91
|-
|scope=col style="background-color: #cc9966"|3rd
| Rui Patrício
| Sporting CP
| align="center" |50
|-
! colspan="5" |
|-
| rowspan="3" align="center" |2017|scope=col style="background-color: gold"|1st| Gianluigi Buffon| Juventus| align="center" |251|-
|scope=col style="background-color: silver"|2nd
| Manuel Neuer
| Bayern Munich
| align="center" |103
|-
|scope=col style="background-color: #cc9966"|3rd
| Keylor Navas
| Real Madrid
| align="center" |85
|-
! colspan="5" |
|-
| rowspan="3" align="center" |2018|scope=col style="background-color: gold"|1st| Thibaut Courtois| Chelsea Real Madrid| align="center" |181|-
|scope=col style="background-color: silver"|2nd
| Hugo Lloris
| Tottenham Hotspur
| align="center" |109
|-
|scope=col style="background-color: #cc9966"|3rd
| Gianluigi Buffon
| Juventus Paris Saint-Germain
| align="center" |59
|-
! colspan="5" |
|-
| rowspan="3" align="center" |2019|scope=col style="background-color: gold"|1st| Alisson| Liverpool| align="center" |386|-
|scope=col style="background-color: silver"|2nd
| Marc-André ter Stegen
| Barcelona
| align="center" |104
|-
|scope=col style="background-color: #cc9966"|3rd
| Jan Oblak
| Atlético Madrid
| align="center" |67
|-
! colspan="5" |
|-
| rowspan="3" align="center" |2020|scope=col style="background-color: gold"|1st| Manuel Neuer| Bayern Munich| align="center" |320|-
|scope=col style="background-color: silver"|2nd
| Jan Oblak
| Atlético Madrid
| align="center" |40
|-
|scope=col style="background-color: #cc9966"|3rd
| Alisson
| Liverpool
| align="center" |30
|-
! colspan="5" |
|-
| rowspan="3" align="center" |2021|scope=col style="background-color: gold"|1st| Gianluigi Donnarumma| Milan Paris Saint-Germain| align="center" |170|-
|scope=col style="background-color: silver"|2nd
| Manuel Neuer
| Bayern Munich
| align="center" |75
|-
|scope=col style="background-color: #cc9966"|3rd
| Édouard Mendy
| Chelsea
| align="center" |40
|-
! colspan="5" |
|-
| rowspan="3" align="center" |2022|scope=col style="background-color: gold"|1st| Thibaut Courtois| Real Madrid| align="center" |125|-
|scope=col style="background-color: silver"|2nd
| Emiliano Martínez
| Aston Villa
| align="center" |110
|-
|scope=col style="background-color: #cc9966"|3rd
| Yassine Bounou
| Sevilla
| align="center" |55
|}

 Statistics 

 Continental winners 

 Bold indicates the World's Best Man Goalkeeper winner.

 All-time World's Best Goalkeeper ranking (since 1987) 

 The World's Best Man Goalkeeper of the Century (1901–2000) 

At the end of the 20th century, the IFFHS also voted on the World's Goalkeeper of the Century, won by the Soviet Union's Lev Yashin running ahead of Gordon Banks and Dino Zoff.World - Keeper of the Century

 The World's Best Man Goalkeeper of the Decade (2001–2010) 

In 2011, the IFFHS also voted on The World's Best Goalkeeper of the 21st Century's first decade, taking into consideration goalkeepers' performances during the first decade of the 21st century, between 2001 and 2011; the award was won by the Italy's Gianluigi Buffon running ahead of Iker Casillas and Petr Čech.

 The World's Best Man Goalkeeper of the Past 25 Years: 1987–2012 
In 2012, the IFFHS also voted on The World's Best Goalkeeper of the past 25 years, taking into consideration goalkeepers' performances between 1987 – the year of the award's inception – and 2012; the award was won by the Italy's Gianluigi Buffon running ahead of Iker Casillas and Edwin van der Sar.

The World's Best Man Goalkeeper of the Decade (2011–2020)

In 2021, the IFFHS voted on The World's Best Goalkeeper of the Decade 2011–2020,''' taking into consideration goalkeepers' performances during 2011–2020; the award was won by Manuel Neuer running ahead of Giangluigi Buffon and Thibaut Courtois.

Women's winners

List of winners

Statistics

Continental winners 

 Bold indicates the World's Best Woman Goalkeeper winner.

The World's Best Woman Goalkeeper of the Decade (2011–2020)

See also
International Federation of Football History & Statistics
IFFHS World's Best Club
IFFHS World's Best Player
IFFHS World's Best Top Goal Scorer
IFFHS World's Best International Goal Scorer
IFFHS World Team
IFFHS World's Best Club Coach
IFFHS World's Best National Coach

References

External links
 IFFHS official website
 The World's Best Goalkeeper at IFFHS.de

International Federation of Football History & Statistics
Association football goalkeeper awards
Association football player non-biographical articles